Lee Mi-sook (born April 2, 1960) is a South Korean actress. One of the best-known actresses of 1980s Korean cinema, Lee's most famous films from this era include Bae Chang-ho's Whale Hunting and The Winter That Year Was Warm, Lee Doo-yong's Mulberry and Eunuch, and Kwak Ji-kyoon's Wanderer in Winter. She retired from film after getting married in 1987, though she still appeared on television in dramas such as How's Your Husband? (1993). Then a decade later, Lee made her comeback with an award-winning leading role in E J-yong's feature debut An Affair (1998). She has since remained active in film and television, notably in the May–December romance Solitude (2002), the Dangerous Liaisons adaptation Untold Scandal (2003), the mockumentary Actresses (2009), and the family dramas Smile, Mom (2010)

Career
Lee Mi-sook debuted in film at the age of twenty in Thoughtless Momo in 1979. By the mid-1980s she had become one of the best-known actresses of her era. Together with Lee Bo-hee and Won Mi-kyung, they dominated the screen and were referred to as the "Troika of the 1980s." Her most famous films from this era include Bae Chang-ho's Whale Hunting and The Winter That Year Was Warm, Lee Doo-yong's Mulberry and Eunuch, and Kwak Ji-kyoon's Wanderer in Winter. Her early career lasted until the film Love Triangle in 1987, and then she retired from the cinema after getting married.

Over ten years later, in 1998, Lee returned with a widely praised role in E J-yong's award-winning film An Affair, about a woman who falls in love with her sister's fiancé. Using this film as a springboard, she re-launched her career.

In 2000, Lee was cast in the high-profile project The Legend of Gingko, which was considered to be production company Kang Je-gyu Film's followup to the successful Shiri (even though Kang himself was not directing). However the film proved to be a critical and commercial disappointment. Lee's next two films, Kiss Me Much and Oh! Lala Sisters, were also more or less ignored by audiences. In contrast, her appearances in TV dramas such as Solitude (2002) were more successful.

However, 2003 was one of Lee's best years, with her highly praised role in E J-yong's Untold Scandal, a retelling of the novel Dangerous Liaisons set in the Joseon Dynasty, and her role as a single mother in Lee Eon-hee's well-received melodrama ...ing.

Lee next starred in Hellcats, a 2008 romantic comedy that traces the lives and loves of three characters at different stages of womanhood. Then in 2009 Lee reunited with E J-yong in Actresses, a semi-improvisational mockumentary featuring six actresses each playing themselves.

In 2011, Lee launched her own lingerie line Starit, which was sold on home shopping channels. This would've been virtually unheard of in previous years with the fashion industry's historically narrow focus on young women. But since 2008 the sophisticated and stylish image of actresses such as Lee, Choi Myung-gil and Kim Hee-ae became aspirational for middle-aged women in Korea, and brands specifically targeting women in their 40s and 50s have increased. Lee remains a favorite in editorial spreads in fashion magazines, notably a 2010 Elle Korea feature opposite pop star TOP.

Lee continued to act on television, giving a vulgar, selfish, but human spin to her role as the stepmother in Cinderella's Sister, a ratings hit in 2010. 2012's Love Rain, a Yoon Seok-ho melodrama that jumps between the 1970s and the present, inked overseas distribution deals, but was unsuccessful domestically.

After a judging stint on reality acting talent program Miracle Audition, Lee hosted the cable talk show Bad Scene, which featured celebrities who reveal bad or embarrassing scenes from their past.

In August 2022, she left SidusHQ and signed with new agency Hunus Entertainment.

Lawsuit
In 2012, Lee was embroiled in a controversy when she was sued by her former agency, The Contents Media, after she moved to a new agency, Hoya Spotainment. The Seoul High Court ruled that Lee was guilty of breach of contract and ordered her to pay  in damages. However, The Contents Media filed an appeal, stating that the agency was owed at least double the amount. They alleged that Lee had been involved in a romantic relationship with a man 17 years her junior in 2006, whom they claimed to have paid off in millions of won to keep him from talking to the press and tarnishing Lee's image. Lee counter-sued The Contents Media and the two reporters who broke the story for defamation. Lee lost her appeal in February 2013, and the Seoul High Court ruled for her to pay the amount in the original ruling.

In August 2013, she signed with another agency, SidusHQ.

Personal life
In 2007, Lee and her husband Hong Sung-ho, a plastic surgeon, divorced after 20 years of marriage. They have a son and a daughter.

Filmography
*Note; the whole list is referenced.

Television series

Variety show

Book

Awards

References

External links
Lee Mi-sook at SidusHQ 

20th-century South Korean actresses
21st-century South Korean actresses
South Korean film actresses
South Korean television actresses
1960 births
Living people
People from North Chungcheong Province
South Korean Buddhists
Best Actress Paeksang Arts Award (film) winners